Thakarpada may refer to:

 Thakarpada (551539), a village in Talasari taluka of Palghar district in Maharashtra, India; located close to the National Highway 8, near Sanjan railway station
 Thakarpada (551567), a village in Talasari taluka of Palghar district in Maharashtra, India; located on the Maharashtra State Highway 73, near the Talasari town